Ah Chee is a surname. Notable people with the surname include:

 Brendon Ah Chee (born 1993), Australian rules footballer
 Callum Ah Chee (born 1997), Australian rules footballer, brother of Brendon
 Loh Ah Chee (1922–1997), Malaysian sports shooter

See also
 Vernon Ah Kee (born 1967), Australian artist